Ntu is a village in the Peren district of Nagaland, India. It is located in the Tening Circle.

Demographics 

According to the 2011 census of India, Ntu has 209 households. The effective literacy rate (i.e. the literacy rate of population excluding children aged 6 and below) is 76.35%.

References 

Villages in Tening Circle